ECM Real Estate Investments A.G. is bankrupted real estate developer based in Luxembourg, that was active mostly in Czech Republic, but also in China, Poland or Russia.

Company was founded in 1991 by Michal Janků, he is now still its CEO and through ECM Group N.V. largest shareholder (77%) of the company. Company owned inter alia two tallest buildings in the Czech Republic - City Tower and City Empiria. In 2006 company went on IPO on Prague Stock Exchange with price per stock 1,318 CZK (47 EUR), getting market capitalization 262.7 mil. EUR Stocks became part of PX Index and eventually reached price 2,000 CZK per share.

Mainly as result of late-2000s financial crisis company went bankrupt in May 2011 and to liquidation since July 2011. In 2012 liquidation was changed to reorganization, but reverted to liquidation in February 2013.

Before its bankruptcy, ECM was involved in the development of V Tower in Prague.

Financial data

References

Real estate companies of the Czech Republic
Real estate companies of China
Defunct companies of Luxembourg